The Oldenburg G 4.2 steam locomotives were goods train engines built for the Grand Duchy of Oldenburg State Railways (Großherzoglich Oldenburgische Staatseisenbahnen) between 1895 and 1909 in several series.

History 
They were compound locomotives manufactured by Hanomag based on a Prussian design, the Prussian G 4.2. Of the total of 27 examples, 19 were to have been taken over in 1923 by the Deutsche Reichsbahn as DRG class 53.10 with numbers 53 1001–1011 and 53 1051–1058. In the 1925 DRG renumbering plan for steam locomotives, however, only eleven engines were listed: numbers 53 1001–1003 and 53 1051–1058. Numbers 53 1001 and 1002 (previously 53 1004 and 1005) came from the first series, number 53 1003 (previously 53 1011) from the second and 53 1051-1058 from the third.

Description 
The first vehicles were equipped with an outside valve gear of the Allan type. The 15 engines delivered from 1907 had an outside Walschaerts valve gear. The latter were also fitted with a Ranafier steam dryer and a steam dome.

On a line with a 0.5% incline, the engines attained a speed of 30 km/h when hauling a 500 tonne train.

See also 
Grand Duchy of Oldenburg State Railways
List of Oldenburg locomotives and railbuses
Länderbahnen

Notes

References

Further reading

External links 
 

0-6-0 locomotives
G 4.2
Railway locomotives introduced in 1895
Hanomag locomotives
Standard gauge locomotives of Germany
C n2v locomotives
Freight locomotives